Rivera is a surname of Spanish and Italian origin which was the old spelling of ribera, the Spanish word for "riverbank"...

People with the surname
 Adrienne Rivera, American para-alpine skier
 Albert Rivera (born 1979), Catalan politician
 Alberto Rivera (activist) (1935–1997), anti-Catholic religious activist
 Alexis Marie Rivera (1977–2012), American transgender advocate
 Alicia Herrera Rivera (1928-2013), Chilean feminist lawyer
 Andy Rivera (born 1994), Colombian urbano singer
 Angélica Rivera (born 1969), Mexican actress
 Aníbal Meléndez Rivera (1948–2021), Puerto Rican politician
 Antonio Rivera (1963–2005), Puerto Rican boxer
 Ariel Rivera (born 1966), Filipino actor and singer
 Arturo Rivera (1945–2020), Mexican artist
 Belarmino Rivera (born 1956), retired Honduran football player
 Benjamín Rivera (born 1969), Mexican voice actor
 Brent Rivera (born 1998), American social media personality
 Carlos Rivera (born 1986), Mexican singer
 Carlos Rivera (disambiguation), multiple people
 Chiquis Rivera (born 1985), American singer
 Chita Rivera (born 1933), American actress and dancer
 Coryn Rivera (born 1992), American racing cyclist
 Danny Rivera (born 1945), Puerto Rican singer
 David Rivera (born 1965), US Representative, Florida
 Diego Rivera (1886–1957), Mexican muralist
 Doriana Rivera (born 1977), Badminton player
 Eliu Rivera (1943–2017), former Deputy Mayor
 Emilio Rivera (born 1961), American film and television actor
 Emmanuel Rivera (born 1996), Puerto Rican baseball player
 Erica Rivera (born 1988), American actress and singer
 Fernando Rivera y Moncada (1725–1781), Spanish colonial soldier and official in New Spain
 Filiberto Rivera (born 1982), basketball player
 Frances Rivera (born 1970), news anchor at WHDH-TV
 Fructuoso Rivera (1784–1854), Uruguayan politician and general, President of the Republic at the beginning of the 19th century
 Gabriel Rivera (1961–2018), American football player
 Geraldo Rivera (born 1943), journalist
 Gianni Rivera (born 1943), Italian football player
 Graciela Rivera (1921–2011), singer
 Guillermo Rivera (born 1971), soccer player, former El Salvador international
 Ismael Rivera (1931–1987), composer and singer of salsa music
 James Rivera (born 1960), singer
 Jamie Rivera (born 1966), Filipino musician
 Jenni Rivera (1969–2012), Mexican musician
 Jerry Rivera (born 1973), salsa singer
 Jim Rivera (1921–2017), American baseball player
 Jimmie Rivera (born 1989), American MMA fighter
 Joel Rivera (born 1978), American politician
 John Rivera (Rocky Romero; born 1982), Cuban-born American professional wrestler
 Jorge Rivera (fighter) (born 1972), retired American MMA fighter
 Jorge Rivera (basketball) (born 1973), basketball player
 Jose Rivera (politician) (born 1936), politician
 José Rivera (playwright) (born 1955), playwright
 José Antonio Rivera (born 1973), boxer
 José Eustasio Rivera (1888–1928), Colombian writer
 José Rivera (volleyball) (born 1977), Puerto Rican volleyball player
 Jose Luis Rivera (born 1960), Puerto Rican wrestler
 Jovette Rivera (born 1982), American Musician and Artist
 Juan Rivera (baseball) (born 1978), baseball player
 Juan Rivera (explorer), 18th-century Spanish explorer
 Leonor Rivera, lover of the Philippine national hero Jose Rizal
 Lionel Rivera (born 1956), American politician
 Luis Antonio Rivera (born 1930), Puerto Rican television personality and comedian
 Luis Rivera (infielder) (born 1964), Puerto Rican baseball coach and player
 Lupillo Rivera (born 1972), Mexican banda singer
 Mailon Rivera, actor
 Marco Rivera (born 1972), professional football player
 Marian Rivera (born 1984), Filipino actress and commercial model
 Mariano Rivera (born 1969), Panamanian baseball player
 Marika Rivera (1919–2010), actress
 Mark Rivera (born 1952), musician
 Maura Rivera (born 1984), Chilean ballerina
 Mike Rivera (baseball) (born 1976), baseball player
 Mychal Rivera (born 1990), NFL player
 Naomi Rivera, politician
 Naya Rivera (1987–2020), actress
 Oscar López Rivera (born 1943), political prisoner
 Pedro Ignacio Rivera (1759–1833), Bolivian revolutionary
 Peter M. Rivera (born 1946), American politician
 Prisilla Rivera (born 1984), Dominican Republic volleyball player
 Reinaldo Rivera (born 1963), Spanish-born American serial killer
 René Rivera (born 1983), baseball player
 Robbie Rivera (born 1973), Puerto Rican house music producer and DJ
 Ron Rivera (born 1962), American football player and coach
 Ron Rivera (public health) (1948–2008), American relief worker
 Rubén Rivera (born 1973), baseball player
 Salvador Guerra Rivera (born 2002), Spanish chess player
 Sandy Rivera, American record producer, house music DJ and label owner
 Saúl Rivera (born 1977), baseball player
 Scarlet Rivera (born 1950), American violinist
 Sophie Rivera (1938–2021), Puerto Rican-American artist and photographer 
 Sylvia Rivera (1951–2002), American transgender activist
 Tammy Rivera (born 1986), American television personality, singer, fashion designer, and businesswoman
 Temario Rivera, political science professor
 Teresa Rivera (born 1966), Mexican swimmer
 Tomás Rivera (1935–1984), Chicano author, poet, and educator
 Víctor Rivera (volleyball) (born 1976), Puerto Rican volleyball player
 Víctor Rivera (professional wrestler) (born 1944), Puerto Rican wrestler
 Cayetano Rivera Ordóñez (born 1977), Spanish bullfighter
 Mon Rivera, two musicians
 Norberto Rivera Carrera (born 1942), Mexican cardinal
 Zuleyka Rivera (born 1987), Miss Universe 2006 from Puerto Rico
 Francisco Rivera Ordóñez (born 1974), Spanish bullfighter
 Alberto Rivera Pizarro (born 1978), Spanish footballer
 Ingrid Marie Rivera (born 1983), 2nd runner-up of Miss World 2005 and Miss Universe Puerto Rico 2008
 Nick Rivera Caminero (stage name Nicky Jam), reggaeton artist

Variants of the surname

Variants of the surname include "de Rivera" and "D'Rivera".

 José Antonio Primo de Rivera, Spanish politician
 Miguel Primo de Rivera, Spanish dictator
Paquito D'Rivera, Cuban musician

Fictional characters
 Alicia Rivera, The Clique
 Eugene Rivera, Oz
 Eduardo Rivera, Extreme Ghostbusters
 Manny Rivera, El Tigre: The Adventures of Manny Rivera
 Rivera clan: Hector, Imelda, Miguel, Socorro (Coco), et al.; Coco (2017 film)

People with the given name

Rivera is uncommon as a given name or middle name.

 José Rivera Indarte (1814–1845), Argentine poet and journalist

See also
 Rivera (disambiguation)
 Ribera (disambiguation)
 Riviera (disambiguation)
 Riva (surname)

References

Spanish-language surnames
Surnames of Puerto Rican origin